The Social Democratic Party (SDP; formerly Social Democratic Union, SDS) was a political party in Latvia formed by a splinter group from the Latvian Social Democratic Labour Party (LSDSP) after the leader of the LSDSP faction in the Saeima, Egils Baldzēns, lost to Juris Bojārs in the elections for party chairman on 27 October 2001. The major factor in the schism was the increasing intimacy between the LSDSP and the For Human Rights in United Latvia Bloc, considered to be excessively pro-Russian by the more nationalist members in Baldzēns' breakaway wing of the party. The newly formed SDS held its founding congress in Riga on 24 March 2002. In the 2002 election, the party won 1.5% of the popular vote and no seats. The last leader of the party was Egils Rutkovskis.

In January 2009, the party joined the Harmony Centre coalition.  It merged into the Harmony party in 2010.

Election results

Legislative elections

European Parliament elections

Footnotes

External links
Official web site

Defunct political parties in Latvia
Social democratic parties in Latvia